Cabela's Trophy Bucks is a hunting simulation video game, in which a player can track and stalk a variety of trophy deer over 24 states and provinces across North America. Species includes whitetail, Rocky Mountain mule deer, sitka, desert mule deer, Columbian black tail and many others.

The game was published by Activision Value in conjunction with hunting supply company Cabela's.

References

External links 
 Cabela's Trophy Bucks Game Reviews

2007 video games
Activision games
Cabela's video games
PlayStation 2 games
Wii games
Xbox 360 games
First-person shooters
North America-exclusive video games
Video games developed in Romania
Fun Labs games
Sand Grain Studios games
Magic Wand Productions games